Covington is a ghost town in Smith County, Kansas, United States.

History
Covington was issued a post office in 1872. The post office was discontinued in 1890.

References

Former populated places in Smith County, Kansas
Former populated places in Kansas